Models and Metrics is the third studio album by American jam band Family Groove Company released in 2008.

Personnel
Janis Wallin - Bass and Vocals
Jordan Wilkow - Hammond B-3, Rhodes, Piano, and Vocals
Adam Lewis - Guitar
Mattias Blanck - Drums, Percussion, and Vocals

Track listing
"Every Time You Shake It"
"The Unlimited Space Around Us"
"We Could"
"Tutear"
"The World Is Watching (part two)"
"White Picket Fence"
"Professionals Here"
"Another Before I Go"
"Falling Off the Fence" 
"Well In Hand"

Family Groove Company albums
2008 albums